The cinema of Vietnam originates in the 1920s and has largely been shaped by wars that have been fought in the country from the 1940s to the 1970s. The better known Vietnamese language-films include Cyclo, The Scent of Green Papaya and Vertical Ray of the Sun, all by French-trained Việt Kiều director Tran Anh Hung. In recent years, as Vietnam's film industry has modernized and moved beyond government-backed propaganda films, contemporary Vietnamese filmmakers have gained a wider audience with films such as Buffalo Boy, Bar Girls and The White Silk Dress.

Early films
In the 1920s, a group of Vietnamese intellectuals formed the Huong Ky Film Company in Hanoi. It produced documentaries on the funeral of Emperor Khải Định and the enthronement of Bảo Đại. There was also the silent feature, Một đồng kẽm tậu được ngựa (A Penny for a Horse).
The first sound films were produced from 1937 to 1940, with Trọn với tình (True to Love), Khúc khải hoàn (The Song of Triumph) and Toét sợ ma (Toét's Scared of Ghosts) by the Asia Film Group studio in Hanoi with the participation of artist Tám Danh. The Vietnam Film Group, led by Trần Tấn Giàu produced Một buổi chiều trên sông Cửu Long (An Evening on the Mekong River) and Thầy Pháp râu đỏ (The Red-Bearded Sorcerer).

Two other films, Cánh đồng ma (The Ghost Field) and Trận phong ba (The Storm), were made in 1937 and 1938 in Hong Kong with Vietnamese actors and dialogue, but both were financial failures.

The government's Ministry of Information and Propaganda formed a film department around 1945 and documented battles in the First Indochina War in the documentaries Trận Mộc Hóa (Mộc Hóa Battle) in 1948, Trận Đông Khê (Đông Khê Battle) in 1950 Chiến thắng Tây Bắc (North West Victory) in 1952, Việt Nam trên đường thắng lợi (Việt Nam on the Road to Victory) in 1953 and Dien Bien Phu (1954).

War years
With the end of the First Indochina War and the creation of North Vietnam and South Vietnam, there were two Vietnamese film industries, with the Hanoi industry focusing on documentary and drama films and Saigon on war or comedy films.

Hanoi's Vietnam Film Studio was established in 1956 and the Hanoi Film School opened in 1959. The first feature film produced in the Democratic Republic of Vietnam was a nationalistic work directed by Nguyễn Hồng Nghị, Chung một dòng sông (Together on the Same River). There was even an animated feature, Đáng đời Thằng Cáo (A Just Punishment for the Fox) in 1960.

Documentaries and feature films from Hanoi attracted attention at film festivals in Eastern Europe at the time. The documentary Nước về Bắc Hưng Hải (Water Returns to Bắc Hưng Hải) won the Golden Award at the 1959 Moscow Film Festival, and the 1963 feature by Phạm Kỳ Nam, Chị Tư Hậu (Sister Tư Hậu) won the Silver Award at Moscow. It starred lead actress Trà Giang.

The Hanoi-based industry mainly documented the Vietnam War. Between 1965 and 1973, 463 newsreels, 307 documentaries and 141 scientific films were produced, in contrast to just 36 feature films and 27 cartoons. Films during this period include the documentaries Du kích Củ Chi (Củ Chi Guerillas) in 1967 and Lũy thép Vĩnh Linh (Vĩnh Linh Steel Rampart) in 1970, which included footage from battles. Other films, such as Đường ra phía trước (The Road to the Front) in 1969 and Những người săn thú trên núi Dak-sao (Hunters on Dak-sao Mountain) in 1971 were docudramas.

Feature films from this time include Nguyễn Văn Trỗi (1966), Đường về quê mẹ (Road Back to Mother) (1971), Truyện vợ chồng Anh Lực (The Story of Anh Lực and his Wife) in 1971, and Em bé Hà Nội (Girl from Hanoi) in 1975.

Saigon produced numerous documentary and public information films, as well as feature films. The most well known feature film of the late 1950s was Chúng Tôi Muốn Sống (We Want To Live), a realistic depiction of the bloody land reform campaign in North Vietnam under Communist-dominated Vietminh.  Some mid-1960s black-and-white features dealt with war themes, with actors such as Đoàn Châu Mậu and La Thoại Tân.  Some later popular color features revolved around the theme of family or personal tragedy in a war-torn society, such as Người Tình Không Chân Dung (The Faceless Lover) starring Kiều Chinh, Xa Lộ Không Đèn (Dark Highway) starring Thanh Nga, Chiếc Bóng Bên Đường (A Silhouette by the Road) starring Kim Cương and Thành Được.  Comedy movies were usually released around Tết, the Vietnamese New Year; most notable was Triệu Phú Bất Đắc Dĩ (The Reluctant Millionaire) starring the well-loved comedian Thanh Việt.

Joseph Mankiewicz's adaptation of Graham Greene's The Quiet American was filmed in and around Saigon in 1957. American actor Marshall Thompson directed and starred in A Yank in Vietnam, or Year of the Tiger in 1964.

Reunification
After Reunification of North Vietnam and South Vietnam, studios in the former South Vietnam turned to making Socialist Realism films. Vietnamese feature film output increased and by 1978 the number of feature films made each year was boosted from around three annually during the war years to 20.

Films from the years following the war focused on heroic efforts in the revolution, human suffering created by the war and social problems of post-war reconstruction. Films from this time include Mùa gió chướng (Season of the Whirlwind) in 1978 and Cánh đồng hoang (The Abandoned Field: Free Fire Zone) in 1979.

Modernity

The shift to a market economy in 1986 dealt a blow to Vietnamese filmmaking, which struggled to compete with video and television. The number of films produced in Vietnam has dropped off sharply since 1987. Still, a number of filmmakers continued to produce films seen on the arthouse circuit. These include Trần Văn Thủy's Hà Nội trong mắt ai? (Hanoi Through Whose Eyes?, 1983) and Chuyện tử tế (Story of Good Behavior, 1987) and Trần Anh Trà's Người công giáo huyện Thống Nhất (A Catholic in Thống Nhất District, 1985), Trần Vũ's Anh và em (Siblings, 1986), Đặng Nhật Minh's Bao gio cho den thang muoi (When the Tenth Month Comes, 1984), Đặng Nhật Minh's Cô gái trên sông (Girl on the River, 1987), Nguyển Khắc Lợi's Tướng về hưu (The Retired General) and Đặng Nhật Minh's Mùa ổi (Guava Season, 2001).

Tony Bui's Ba mùa (Three Seasons, 1998) won prizes at the Sundance Film Festival in 1998. Trần Văn Thủy's Tiếng vĩ cầm ở Mỹ Lai (The Sound of the Violin at My Lai) won Best Short Film prize at the 43rd Asia Pacific Film Festival in 1999. Đời cát (Sandy Life) by Nguyễn Thanh won best picture at the same festival the following year. Bùi Thạc Chuyên's Cuốc xe đêm (Night Cyclo Trip) won third prize in the short film category at the Cannes Film Festival in 2000.

European productions in Vietnam are better known. These include The Lover, Indochine and films by Việt Kiều directors Tran Anh Hung and Tony Bui. Tran's first feature, The Scent of the Green Papaya won the Golden Camera at the Cannes Film Festival in 1993 and was the first Vietnamese film nominated for an Oscar in 1994. His other films include Xích lô (Cyclo, 1995) and Mùa hè chiều thẳng đứng (Vertical Ray of the Sun) in 2000. Another European co-production, Mùa len trâu (The Buffalo Boy) by Nguyễn Võ Nghiêm Minh, has won numerous awards at film festivals, including the Chicago International Film Festival in 2004.

In recent years, Vietnamese filmmakers have moved in a more commercial directions to try to regain audiences lost to television and DVDs. One of the most successful films of recent years at the Vietnamese box office has been Phi Tiến Sơn's Lưới trời (Heaven's Net), a film about corruption that closely mirrors the trial of Ho Chi Minh City gangster Nam Cam.

An even bigger film was Lê Hoàng's 2002 Gai nhay (Bar Girls), which depicted Ho Chi Minh City's titillating and seedy nightlife while also warning of the dangers of HIV and AIDS. Featuring the first government-approved topless scene, it spawned a sequel, Lọ lem hè phố (Street Cinderella), in 2004. Another film along these lines is Nữ tướng cướp (Gangsta Girls). There are also romantic comedies, such as Hon Truong Ba Da Hang Thit (Truong Ba's Soul in Butcher's Body) in 2006 and Khi dan ong co bau (When Men Get Pregnant) from 2004.

Việt Linh has made several critically acclaimed films.

In 2007, Muoi (Muoi: the Legend of a Portrait), the first horror film in Vietnam after the Fall of Saigon (collaborated by Korean producers), also became the first rated film with an under-16 ban.

Highest-grossing film

Trấn Thành’s Bố Già  Is  The Highest-Grossing Vietnamese Movie, making over 420 billion ₫

See also
 Cinema of the world
 Asian cinema
 Communications in Vietnam
 East Asian cinema
 Media of Vietnam
 Southeast Asian cinema
 Vietnam Multimedia Corporation
 Vietnam Television
 World cinema

References

Vietnam Cultural Profile by the British Council
Johnson, Kay (May 5, 2003). "Social evil sells", Time.

External links
Vietnamese-language films  at the Internet Movie Database